CMR can refer to:

Businesses
Cash Money Records, an American record label and a subsidiary of Universal Music Group
California Management Review, a management research journal published by the University of California
Century Media Records, an independent rock and roll record label
Canadian Multicultural Radio or CJSA-FM (CMR Diversity FM 101.3), a Toronto radio station
CMR (motorcycle company), also known as CMCR (Centre de montage et de récupération), a French motorcycle manufacturer
Country Music Radio, a defunct European radio station
Cross Movement Records, Christian hip-hop record label
CMR Falabella (Crédito Multi-Rotativo Falabella), a credit card issued by S.A.C.I. Falabella

Concepts
Carcinogenic, Mutagenic or toxic to Reproduction (CMR substances), a concept in the Registration, Evaluation, Authorisation and Restriction of Chemicals law of the European Union
Civil-military relations, the relationship between civil society and the military organization established to protect it

Entertainment
Chad, Matt & Rob, a group of filmmakers known for their prank videos and Choose Your Own Adventure style short films that blend comedy with horror, adventure and sci-fi

Laws and treaties
CMR Convention, from the French Convention relative au contrat de transport international de marchandises par route. In English, the United Nations Convention on the Contract for the International Carriage of Goods by Road
Code of Massachusetts Regulations, a compilation of regulations adopted by government agencies in Massachusetts, United States

Medicine
 Comprehensive medication review, a type of medication therapy management program
 Cardiac magnetic resonance imaging, a medical imaging technology for non-invasive assessment of the function and structure of the cardiovascular system.

Military organizations
Canadian Mounted Rifles (disambiguation), several cavalry and infantry units in the Boer War and the World War I
Chief Makhanda Regiment, an infantry regiment of the South African Army

Places
CMR, a country code for Cameroon
CMR, a code for Colmar Airport, an airport near Colmar, Haut-Rhin department, France

Religious institutions
 Congregation of the Mother of the Redeemer, a Vietnamese Roman Catholic religious order

Schools and research facilities
Charles M. Russell High School, a secondary school in Great Falls, Montana
Chemistry and Metallurgy Research Facility, a nuclear facility at Los Alamos National Laboratory
Le Collège militaire royal de Saint-Jean, a military academy in Saint-Jean-sur-Richelieu, Quebec

Science and technology
 Carbon-13 NMR, the application of NMR spectroscopy to carbon-13
 Cardiovascular magnetic resonance imaging, the use of MRI for assessing the function and structure of the heart and cardiovascular system
Cellular mobile radiophone, a cellphone (technically speaking)
Chayes-Matcha-Redner representation, a graphical representation of Ising spin glass
 Clinical Microbiology Reviews, an academic journal covering microbiology and immunology
 Colossal magnetoresistance, an electrical phenomenon
 Common-mode rejection ratio, a measure of the capability of an instrument to reject a signal that is common to both input leads
 Conventional Magnetic Recording, a type of Perpendicular Magnetic Recording
 Clear motion rate, an LCD screen technology used by Samsung to display of fast-moving images

Video games
Colin McRae Rally, a racing game